Kentucky supplemental roads and rural secondary highways are the lesser two of the four functional classes of highways constructed and maintained by the Kentucky Transportation Cabinet, the state-level agency that constructs and maintains highways in Kentucky. The agency splits its inventory of state highway mileage into four categories:
The State Primary System includes Interstate Highways, Parkways, and other long-distance highways of statewide importance that connect the state's major cities, including much of the courses of Kentucky's U.S. Highways.
The State Secondary System includes highways of regional importance that connect the state's smaller urban centers, including those county seats not served by the state primary system.
The Rural Secondary System includes highways of local importance, such as farm-to-market roads and urban collectors.
Supplemental Roads are the set of highways not in the first three systems, including frontage roads, bypassed portions of other state highways, and rural roads that only serve their immediate area.

The same-numbered highway can comprise sections of road under different categories. This list contains descriptions of Supplemental Roads and highways in the Rural Secondary System numbered 700 to 799 that do not have portions within the State Primary and State Secondary systems.

Kentucky Route 700

Kentucky Route 700 is a  rural secondary state highway in central McCreary County that runs from a boat ramp along the Big South Fork of the Cumberland River in the northern portion of the Big South Fork National River and Recreation Area to Kentucky Route 90 south of Honeybee via Marshes Siding.

Major intersections

Kentucky Route 701

Kentucky Route 701 (KY 701) is a  rural secondary state highway in central McCreary County that runs from Kentucky Route 92 east of Smith Town to Kentucky Route 1651 southwest of Whitley City.

Kentucky Route 702

Kentucky Route 702 (KY 702) is a  supplemental state highway in southwestern Elliott County that runs from a point along Neal Howard Creek Road southwest of Little Sandy to Kentucky Route 7 at Little Sandy.

Kentucky Route 703

Kentucky Route 703 (KY 703) is a  state highway in central Hickman County that runs from U.S. Route 51 in northern Clinton to Kentucky Route 307 and O'Neal Road north of Nichols.

Major intersections

Kentucky Route 704

Kentucky Route 704 (KY 704) is a  rural secondary state highway in northeastern Cumberland County and southern Adair County that runs from Kentucky Route 61 north of Burkesville to Kentucky Route 55 south of Columbia via Amandaville and Fairplay.

Major intersections

Kentucky Route 705

Kentucky Route 705 (KY 705) is a  rural secondary state highway in southwestern Morgan County that runs from Kentucky Route 844 at Salem to Kentucky Route 772 northwest of Bonny via Nickell, Grassy Creek, and Woodsbend.

Major intersections

Kentucky Route 706

Kentucky Route 706 (KY 706) is a  rural secondary state highway in northeastern Morgan County and southern Elliott County that runs from Kentucky Route 172 in Crockett to Kentucky Route 7 northeast of Green via Eldridge, and Isonville.

Major intersections

Kentucky Route 707

Kentucky Route 707 (KY 707) is a  rural secondary state highway in northeastern Lawrence County that runs from Kentucky Route 3 northwest of Fallsburg to U.S. Route 23 at Buchanan.

Major intersections

Kentucky Route 708

Kentucky Route 708 (KY 708) is a  rural secondary state highway in northeastern Owsley County and eastern Lee County that runs from Kentucky Route 30 in Lerose to Spencer Bend Road on the Breathitt County line northeast of Fillmore via Lone, Tallega, Canyon Falls, and Fillmore.

Major intersections

Kentucky Route 711

Kentucky Route 711 (KY 711) is a  rural secondary highway in northeastern Morgan County and northwestern Elliott County that runs from Redwine Road and Clevitt Branch Road east of Redwine to Kentucky Route 173 on the Rowan County line northwest of Wyett via Redwine, Wrigley, Leisure, Oak Hill, and Blairs Mills.

Major intersections

Kentucky Route 712

Kentucky Route 712 (KY 712) is a  rural secondary state highway in eastern Oldham County and western Henry County that runs from Kentucky Route 146 in northeastern LaGrange to Kentucky Route 153 in northern Jericho via Tarascon.

Major intersections

Kentucky Route 714

Kentucky Route 714 is a  rural secondary highway in southeastern Shelby County. The highway begins at a four-legged intersection in the village of Southville. KY 44 heads south along Mount Eden Road and west along Southville Pike, KY 53 heads north along Mount Eden Road, and KY 714 heads east along Hempridge Road. KY 714 meets the eastern end of KY 2866 (Woodlawn Road) and curves north to Hemp Ridge, where the route crosses a tributary of Guist Creek and an R.J. Corman Railroad Group line. The highway crosses over I-64 with no access and meets the eastern end of KY 1790 (Hooper Station Road) near Hooper before reaching its northern terminus at US 60 (Frankfort Road) south of Guist Creek Lake and west of Clay Village.

Major intersections

Kentucky Route 718

Kentucky Route 718 is a  rural secondary state highway in eastern Knox County that runs from Kentucky Route 223 and Walker Road at Dewitt to Paint Gap Branch Road and Pigeon Fork Road northeast of Erose via Walker and Erose.

Major intersections

Kentucky Route 719

Kentucky Route 719 is a  rural secondary state highway in southern Elliott County that runs from Laurel Fork Road at the Morgan County line north of Elkfork to Kentucky Route 32 at Fannin.

Major intersections

Kentucky Route 720

Kentucky Route 720 is a  rural secondary state highway in northern Grayson County and southern Hardin County that runs from Mt. Hebron Road, Floyd Clark Road, and St. Paul Road northeast of Tar Hill to Kentucky Route 84 in southern Sonora via Tar Hill, Saint Paul, Big Clifty, Lacon, Spurrier, and Flint Hill.

Major intersections

Kentucky Route 721

Kentucky Route 721 is a  rural secondary state highway in western Knott County that runs from Kentucky Route 1088 southeast of Cordia to Kentucky Route 550 at Fisty via Ritchie.

Kentucky Route 722

Kentucky Route 722 is a  rural secondary state highway in east central Logan County that runs from Kentucky Route 1588 to U.S. Route 68.

Kentucky Route 723

Kentucky Route 723 is a  rural secondary state highway in eastern Livingston County and northwestern Crittenden County that runs from Haynes Park Road and a boat ramp on the Cumberland River in Pinckneyville to Kentucky Route 135 and School Avenue in southern Tolu via Salem and Irma.

Major intersections

Kentucky Route 724

Kentucky Route 724 is a  rural secondary and supplemental state highway in west central McCracken County that runs from Kentucky Route 3520 northeast of Future City to Kentucky Route 358 southeast of Grahamville.

Major intersections

Kentucky Route 725

Kentucky Route 725 is a  rural secondary state highway in northwestern McCracken County that runs from Kentucky Route 305 at West Paducah to Kentucky Route 358 west of Rossington via Maxon Crossing, Heath, Cimota City, and Woodville.

Major intersections

Kentucky Route 726

Kentucky Route 726 is a  rural secondary and supplemental state highway in western McCracken County that runs from U.S. Route 62 northeast of Lovelaceville to Kentucky Route 725 west of Heath via West Future City.

Major intersections

Kentucky Route 729

Kentucky Route 729 is a  rural secondary state highway in southwestern Green County that runs from U.S. Route 68 south of Liletown to Kentucky Route 218 southwest of Pierce.

Kentucky Route 730

Kentucky Route 730 is an  rural secondary highway in eastern Lyon County. The highway begins at KY 903 north of Lamasco. KY 730 heads northwest and crosses Sand Hollow Creek and the Eddy Creek arm of Lake Barkley. The highway meets the eastern end of KY 818 before crossing Glass Creek at its junction with KY 293 at Saratoga. KY 730 runs concurrently with KY 293 west to the latter route's terminus at KY 93. Along the way, the routes have two junctions with KY 818 and a diamond interchange with I-24. At the KY 93–KY 293 junction, KY 730 also meets the eastern end of KY 1055. KY 730 heads north along KY 93 and splits west at the south city limit of Eddyville. The highway meets the western end of KY 1055 shortly before the highway reaches Lake Barkley, where the highway turns onto Water Street, which passes between the lake and the Kentucky State Penitentiary, to its terminus at a dead end.

Major intersections

Kentucky Route 731

Kentucky Route 731 is a  rural secondary state highway in western downtown Paducah that runs from U.S. Routes 45 and 62 to U.S. Route 60 and Downs Drive.

Kentucky Route 732

Kentucky Route 732 is a  rural secondary state highway in eastern Calloway County that runs from Kentucky Route 94 and Todd Road to Waterview Lane and Richard Lane along Kentucky Lake east of Boatwright.

Major intersections

Kentucky Route 733

Kentucky Route 733 is a  rural secondary state highway in southeastern Bullitt County and western Nelson County that runs from Kentucky Route 61 northeast of Lebanon Junction to U.S. Route 62 at Cravens west of Bardstown via Bellwood.

Major intersections

Kentucky Route 734

Kentucky Route 734 is a  rural secondary state highway in north central Clinton County that runs from U.S. Route 127 and Kentucky Route 90 north of Snow to US 127 again northwest of Ida via Seventy Six.

Major intersections

Kentucky Route 736

Kentucky Route 736 is a  rural secondary state highway in western and northern Grayson County that runs from Kentucky Route 79 and Lawrence Hayes Road southwest of Caneyville to Kentucky Route 110 south of Falling Branch via Do Stop, Spring Lick, and Yeaman.

Major intersections

Kentucky Route 738

Kentucky Route 738 is a  rural secondary state highway in west southwestern Clinton County. The route runs from the Wolf River Dock on Dale Hollow Lake just a few feet north of the Tennessee state line to U.S. Route 127 Business in southern Albany.

Major intersections

Kentucky Route 739

Kentucky Route 739 is a  rural secondary state highway in south central Logan County. The route runs from Kentucky Route 1041 southeast of Dripping Spring to Kentucky Route 96 northwest of Oakville and south of Russellville. It is known as Johnson Young Road for its entire length.

Kentucky Route 740

Kentucky Route 740 is a  rural secondary highway in northeastern Barren County. The highway begins at US 68 and KY 80, which run concurrently on Edmonton Road, just east of the city of Glasgow. KY 740 heads northeast along Coral Hill Road, which crosses Beaver Creek and meets the western end of KY 2131 (French Mill Road) at Coral Hill. The highway parallels and crosses Duff Branch and intersects KY 70 (Hiseville Main Street) in Hiseville. KY 740 continues northeast along Hiseville–Park Road, which crosses Blue Spring Creek and intersects KY 571 (Seymour–Park Road) at Park. The highway parallels the Barren–Metcalfe county line to its terminus at KY 677 at the Barren–Hart county line very close to the Barren–Metcalfe–Hart county tripoint. KY 677 heads north onto Hart County and southeast into Metcalfe County.

Major intersections

Kentucky Route 741

Kentucky Route 741 is a  rural secondary state highway in McCreary County west of Revelo.

Major intersections

Kentucky Route 742

Kentucky Route 742 is a  rural secondary highway in central McCreary County. The highway begins on Mine 18 Road at the boundary of Big South Fork National River and Recreation Area. KY 742 heads south and curves back north and crosses Roaring Paunch Creek. The highway passes through Hickory Grove and intersects KY 741 near its southern end before reaching its eastern terminus at KY 1651 at Revelo.

Major intersections

Kentucky Route 743

Kentucky Route 743 is a  rural secondary highway in northeastern Warren County and southern Edmonson County. The highway begins at US 31W (Louisville Road) west of Tuckertown. KY 743 follows Boiling Springs Road, which heads northwest to its junction with KY 2630 (Fairview Boiling Springs Road) then heads north toward the Warren–Edmonson county line. The highway crosses Little Beaverdam Creek south of the county line and meets the eastern end of KY 1749 (Wingfield Church Road). KY 743 continues along Chalybeate School Road, which turns east toward Chalybeate. The highway crosses Alexander Creek, meets the northern end of KY 2326 (Otter Gap Road), and meets the southern end of KY 3611 just west of its northern intersection with KY 101 (Chalybeate Road) south of Chalybeate. KY 743 runs concurrently south with KY 101, then the former highway turns east onto New Grove Road. The highway crosses Beaverdam Creek on its way to its end at KY 422 (Pig Road) south of Pig.

Major intersections

Kentucky Route 744

Kentucky Route 744 is a  rural secondary highway that runs across northern Taylor County. The route runs from Kentucky Route 210 and Fallen Timber Road southwest of Durhamtown to Kentucky Route 337 north of Mannsville via Durhamtown, Saloma and Spurlington.

Major intersections

Kentucky Route 745

Kentucky Route 745 is a  rural secondary highway that runs across northeastern Metcalfe County and south central Green County through mostly rural areas. The route follows Mell Ridge Road, running from U.S. 68 east of Sulphur Well to Kentucky Route 487 south of Exie.

Major intersections

References

State highways in Kentucky
Lists of roads in Kentucky